The Nizamat Imambara is a Shia Muslim congregation hall (imambara) in Murshidabad, India. It was built in 1740 AD by Nawab Siraj ud-Daulah and rebuilt in 1847 by Nawab Mansur Ali Khan after it was destroyed by the fires of 1842 and 1846. It is frequently mentioned as the largest imambara in the world.

Construction

Old Nizamat Imambara 
The old Nizamat Imambara was built by Nawab Siraj ud-Daulah in the Nizamat Fort Area. He bought bricks and mortar, and laid the foundation of the building with his own hands. However, the old Imambara was primarily made up of wood. The plot where this Imambara had been built was dug to a depth of 6 feet. It was refilled with soil which was brought from Mecca so that the poor members of the Muslim community could have an experience of Hajj.

Destruction 
The old Imambara caught fire for the first time in 1842 and was partly destroyed. But it was completely destroyed by a fire on 23 December 1846. That day the Nawabs along with the Europeans threw a party to celebrate the weaning ceremony of five-year-old Hassan Ali Mirza. The Imambara caught fire at midnight due to the fireworks left off and was completely burnt down. Nothing survived except the old Madina Mosque.

New Nizamat Imambara 

The new Imambara was built in 1847 by Nawab Nazim Mansur Ali Khan under the supervision and direction of Sadeq Ali Khan just opposite the Hazarduari Palace at a cost of more than  6 lacs. The main entrance just parallel to the north face of the Hazarduari Palace faces south. The masons took only 11 months to finish the construction as in addition to their wages they also received food which allowed them to work day and night. The present Imambara is 680 feet long, however the breadths vary. The central block that has the Madina is 300 feet long. It had been built slightly some feet away from the site of the old building in north. The Imambara stands just opposite to the Hazarduari Palace and is situated just on the banks of the Bhagirathi River. The gap between the shores of the river and the west wall of the Imambara may be a few feet.

The old Madina Mosque was left as it was and a new one was constructed in the newly constructed Imambara. The old Madina Mosque can still be seen standing between the new Imambara and the Hazarduari Palace near the Bacchawali Tope and the Clock Tower of Murshidabad.

The present Imambara has been divided into three large quadrangles as follows: 
 The central quadrangle has the Madina Mosque and the Memberdalan.
 The eastern quadrangle has the Naubat Khana.
 The western quadrangle has a two-storied Mosque. The mosque stands on the Mint Ghat and rises almost from the Bhagirathi River as the distance may be a few feet.
The Memberdalan, which means hall for members, is a hall rather a corridor just beside the Madina Mosque. It has a pulpit and to recite an elegy. The hall also has a verandah. The hall, the verandah and its flooring, are all built with marble. The hall also has a spacious room for the ladies. The vat between this hall and the mosque had silver headed fountains. They worked after the singing of the elegies were over.

The entrance of the Naubat Khana is a huge gate built in Imamia style which is surrounded by this Naubat Khana.

The western quadrangle of the Imambara has a two storied mosque which stands on the Mint Ghat. It has stately pillars and spacious marble floors. The mosque has several magnificent chandeliers, most of them gifted to the Nawabs by the East India Company and several other magnificent equipments.

Map

See also 
 Hazarduari Palace
 Chawk Masjid
 Nawabs of Bengal
 History of Bengal
 Shia Islam in India

References

External links 

Islamic rule in the Indian subcontinent
Rebuilt buildings and structures in India
Mosques in West Bengal
Tourist attractions in Murshidabad
Buildings and structures in Murshidabad district
1847 establishments in British India
Religious buildings and structures completed in 1847